The following is List of Universities and Colleges in Jilin.

References

List of Chinese Higher Education Institutions — Ministry of Education
List of Chinese universities, including official links
Jilin Institutions Admitting International Students

 
Jilin